The following is about the qualification rules and the quota allocation for the short track speed skating at the 2022 Winter Olympics.

Qualification rules
A total quota of 112 athletes are allowed to compete at the Games (56 men and 56 women). Countries are assigned quotas based on their performance during the 2021–22 ISU Short Track Speed Skating World Cup. Each nation is permitted to enter a maximum of four athletes per gender if it qualified a relay team and three if it did not. If, in a specific gender, the NOC has qualified eight individual starting places (i.e. 3 in the 500m, 3 in the 1000m, 2 in the 1500m) then they are allowed a maximum of five. Hosts China are guaranteed a quota of one entry per race for a total of eight athletes. There are a maximum of thirty-two qualifiers for the 500m and 1000m events; thirty-six for the 1500m events; eight for the men's and women's relays; and twelve for the mixed relay.

Additional quota's for the mixed team relay
If there are not twelve NOCs with both two male and two female quotas, and if the maximum allocation limit of 112 has not been reached, then NOCs may receive a maximum of one quota to become eligible for this race. These quotas will be given out in order of the NOCs ranking in the world cup standings until there are twelve qualified teams.

Allocation of remaining quotas
If the maximum of 112 has not been reached after fulfilling all the above qualification than the remaining quotas will be distributed to NOCs qualified in a relay event that have also qualified seven individual starting places in that specific gender. Following that, if there is still remaining quotas, they will be available to any nation that has qualified four athletes in a gender, with priority given to the rankings in the relay standings.

Quota allocation
The ISU announced the complete breakdown of allocations on 9 December 2021, and the final list after reallocations on January 24, 2022.

Relays
Nations could compete in four world cup races, and are ranked by their three best scores. The top eight men's and women's teams qualify while the top twelve mixed teams qualify.

Final standings

Men's

Women's

Mixed team

Individual distances
The first placed racer (per NOC) is ranked based on the three best world cup results, out of four, for each race. This means that multiple skaters could have a part in that ranking. The second and third best were ranked in the same way. For the 500m and 1000m the top 32 qualify, and for the 1500m the top 36 qualify. The next best six nations for each race are shown.

Final standings after four of four races.

Men's

Women's

References

Qualification
Qualification for the 2022 Winter Olympics